Elva Nampeyo (1926–1985) (also known as Elva Tewaguna) was an American studio potter.

Biography
Elva Nampeyo was born 1926 in the Hopi-Tewa Corn Clan atop Hopi First Mesa, Arizona. Her parents were Fannie Nampeyo and Vinton Polacca. Her grandmother Nampeyo had led a revival of ancient traditional pottery and established a family tradition of pottery making. As a child Elva would watch her grandmother make pottery and later her mother taught Elva and her siblings the craft of pottery making.

Nampayo went on to marry Richard Tewaguna and had five children, four of whom, Neva, Elton, Miriam and Adelle followed in the family pottery making tradition. All sign their work with their first names followed by "Nampeyo" and an ear of corn.

Nampayo became an expert at decorating and painting pottery. She specialized in black and red on yellow bowls and jars with traditional migration designs and eagle motifs. Her pieces most often resembled the works of her mother and grandmother. On occasion she could be persuaded to break from tradition and try some designs of her own invention. Elva took great pleasure in making pottery and could form as many as eight pots a day. During her later years, her daughter Adelle would assist her in polishing, decorating and firing her pottery. Nampeyo signed her pottery as "Elva Nampeyo" followed by the corn clan symbol which was initiated by her mother Fannie.

References

 Schaaf, Gregory – Hopi-Tewa Pottery: 500 Artist Biographies.  1998.

External links
  Elva Nampeyo at the Holmes Museum of Anthropology
 "Elva Nampeyo Pottery" search at Google Images

1926 births
1985 deaths
Hopi people
Native American potters
Artists from Arizona
American women ceramists
American ceramists
20th-century American women artists
Native American women artists
Women potters
20th-century ceramists
20th-century Native Americans
20th-century Native American women
Native American people from Arizona